Jimmy Gilmour (born 17 December 1961) is a Scottish former professional footballer who played in the 1980s and 1990s.

Career
Born in Bellshill, Gilmour played for Bargeddie Amateurs, Queen's Park, Partick Thistle, Falkirk, Kilmarnock, Stirling Albion, Clyde, Dumbarton, Bo'ness United, Alloa Athletic and Fauldhouse United.

References

1961 births
Living people
Scottish footballers
Association football wingers
Footballers from Bellshill
Scottish Football League players
Queen's Park F.C. players
Partick Thistle F.C. players
Falkirk F.C. players
Kilmarnock F.C. players
Stirling Albion F.C. players
Clyde F.C. players
Dumbarton F.C. players
Alloa Athletic F.C. players
Bo'ness United F.C. players
Fauldhouse United F.C. players